Sergei Alekseyevich Denisov (born May 12, 1990) is a Russian professional ice hockey goaltender who is currently an unrestricted free agent.

Denisov played with HC Vityaz Podolsk of the Kontinental Hockey League (KHL) during the 2012–13 season.

References

External links

Living people
HC Vityaz players
Russian ice hockey goaltenders
1990 births